Natasha Alam (Russian: Наталья Анатольевна Шиманчук; born Natalia Anatolievna Shimanchuk, born March 10, 1973) is an Uzbekistani–American actress and model. Alam has starred on True Blood and been a cover model for Maxim and Playboy.

Early life
Natasha Alam was born and raised in Tashkent, Uzbek SSR, Soviet Union in a Russian family. She attended school with the aim of becoming a clothing designer. She attended the Tashkent State Technical University for aviation school. Modeling at school led to modeling at events and eventually moving to Moscow, where she signed with an agency. An Italian modeling agency later signed her, and she moved to Italy.

Career
Her first acting role was on the television show Fastlane (2002). She went on to appear on television shows including CSI, NYPD Blue, Nip/Tuck, The Unit, Entourage, and American Heiress. She also played the recurring role of Ava, a Forrester model, in The Bold and the Beautiful from 2004 to 2007. Films she has appeared in include the 2007 horror movie Shadow Puppets and the 2008 comedy The Women. 

In 2010, she appeared in the third season of True Blood as Yvetta, an exotic dancer at Fangtasia, from Estonia. In July of that year, she appeared on the cover, and in the pictorial, of Playboy.
The following year, she shot an anti-bullying film with Joe Reitman, and that August. 27 took part in Rock the Mansion, a fashion show for an anti-bullying campaign, at the Playboy Mansion.

Personal life
Sometime after moving to Italy, Alam met Iranian prince Amir Ebrahim Pahlavi Alam and moved with him to New York City. The couple broke up, then reunited, married in 1998, and moved to London, where she began taking acting lessons. Alam said in 2011 that she then "ran away to Los Angeles because I wanted to act."  In 2001, her husband joined her, but they divorced in 2004. She and her partner, Joe Campana had a daughter, Valentina, in 2009.

Filmography

Film

TV Series

References

External links

1973 births
Living people
Actors from Tashkent
Actresses from Los Angeles
Uzbekistani female models
Uzbekistani film actresses
Uzbekistani emigrants to the United States
Uzbekistani people of Russian descent
American female models
American film actresses
American television actresses
21st-century Uzbekistani actresses
21st-century American actresses